WCTC (1450 AM "Fox Sports New Jersey") is a commercial radio station broadcasting a sports radio format. Licensed to New Brunswick, New Jersey, the station serves Middlesex, Somerset, and Union counties. The station is owned by Beasley Broadcast Group (through Beasley Media Group, LLC).  It is the radio home for Rutgers University athletic events and Somerset Patriots Minor League Baseball games.

WCTC transmits with 1,000 watts, non-directional.  It formerly broadcast in C-QUAM AM stereo. The transmitter is off Valentine Street at South 5th Avenue in Highland Park, New Jersey, near the Raritan River.  Programming is also heard on 250-watt FM translator W228DY at 93.5 MHz in New Brunswick.

History
WCTC is considered New Jersey's first radio station built during the post-World War II broadcast boom. It signed on in 1946.  The following year, it added an FM station, 98.3 WCTC-FM (today WMGQ).  WCTC derives its call sign from the Chanticleer, a flamboyant fighting rooster from the medieval fable Reynard the Fox (Le Roman de Renart). It is also used by Geoffrey Chaucer in the Canterbury Tales which was the Rutgers mascot from 1925 to 1955.

From the 1960s through the 1980s, it adopted a full service middle of the road (MOR) format featuring local news, talk, sports, and adult popular music.  For most of those years, Jack Ellery was the popular wake-up host.

In 1992, WCTC gave up music programming, switching to All-Talk, featuring programming from ABC Radio and Premiere Radio Networks. As of July 2, 2008, WCTC went back to its roots by reverting to an oldies music format.

On February 28, 2011, WCTC changed the format back to talk, launching the local midday show "New Jersey TODAY" from one to three in the afternoon hosted by Bert Baron.

On July 19, 2016, Beasley Media Group announced it would acquire Greater Media and its 21 stations (including WCTC) for $240 million. The FCC approved the sale on October 6, and the sale closed on November 1.

Under Beasley ownership, WCTC was the primary source for winter school closing announcements. WCTC's former Talk format included "This Morning, America's First News with Gordon Deal", "Markley, Van Camp & Robbins," Guy Benson, and local host Tommy G. in afternoon drive time.  WCTC carried hourly news from NBC News Radio.  WCTC also aired special interest shows on the weekends.

In July 2021, WCTC began simulcasting on an FM translator, 93.5 W228DY.  On September 27, 2021, the wctcam.com web site began redirecting to Fox Sports New Jersey.  This coincided with WCTC's format change to sports radio.  On the same day, WCTC's Facebook page was rebranded.

Former on-air staff
Adam Amin
Gordon Deal, host of Wall Street Journal This Morning once served as a News Anchor at the station.   WCTC later carried his syndicated show.
Herb Kaplow
Dave Marash
Bruce Williams, syndicated radio personality. He began his broadcast career at WCTC
Jack Ellery

Former logo

References

External links
FCC History Cards for WCTC

CTC
CTC
Radio stations established in 1946
1946 establishments in New Jersey
Fox Sports Radio stations
Sports radio stations in the United States